Komsomolsk may refer to:

Places
Komsomolsk-on-Amur, a city in Khabarovsk Krai, Russia
Komsomolsk-na-Amure Urban Okrug, a municipal formation which the city of krai significance of Komsomolsk-on-Amur in Khabarovsk Krai, Russia is incorporated as
Komsomolsk, Russia, several inhabited localities in Russia
Horishni Plavni, a city in Poltava Oblast, Ukraine formerly called Komsomolsk
Gongqingcheng, a city in Jiangxi, China, whose name also means "Communist Youth League city"

Other
Komsomolsk (film), a 1938 Soviet drama film directed by Sergei Gerasimov
FC Hirnyk-Sport Komsomolsk, Ukrainian association football club
Комсомольск (band) is an indie rock band from Moscow, Russia

See also
Komsomol (disambiguation)
Komsomolets (disambiguation)
Komsomolsky (disambiguation)